Stiller Bach is a small artificial river in southern Baden-Württemberg, Germany. It flows into the Scherzach in Weingarten.

See also
List of rivers of Baden-Württemberg

References

Rivers of Baden-Württemberg
Upper Swabia
CStillerBach
Rivers of Germany